Adams County is a county in the U.S. state of North Dakota. As of the 2020 census, the population was 2,200. The county seat is Hettinger. The county was created on April 17, 1907, and organized one week later. It was named for John Quincy Adams (1848–1919), a railroad official for the Milwaukee Road Railroad and distant relative of sixth U.S. President John Quincy Adams (1767–1848).

Geography
Adams County lies on the south line of North Dakota. Its south boundary line abuts the north boundary line of the state of South Dakota. Its terrain consists of semi-arid low rolling hills. Its terrain generally slopes eastward, and its highest point is on its upper west boundary line, at 3,002' (915m) ASL.

Adjacent counties

 Hettinger County – north
 Grant County – northeast
 Sioux County – east
 Perkins County, South Dakota – south
 Harding County, South Dakota – southwest
 Bowman County – west
 Slope County – northwest

Major highways
  U.S. Highway 12
  North Dakota Highway 8
  North Dakota Highway 22

Protected areas
 North Lemmon Lake State Game Management Area

Lakes
 North Lemmon Lake
 Mirror Lake

Demographics

2000 census
As of the 2000 census there were 2,593 people, 1,121 households, and 725 families in the county. The population density was 2.6 people per square mile (1.0/km2). There were 1,416 housing units at an average density of 1.4 per square mile (0.6/km2). The racial makeup of the county was 98.50% White, 0.54% Black or African American, 0.31% Native American, 0.15% Asian, 0.04% Pacific Islander, 0.12% from other races, and 0.35% from two or more races. 0.27% of the population were Hispanic or Latino of any race. 40.6% were of German, 27.9% Norwegian and 5.6% English ancestry.

There were 1,121 households, out of which 26.6% had children under the age of 18 living with them, 56.6% were married couples living together, 5.5% had a female householder with no husband present, and 35.3% were non-families. 32.6% of all households were made up of individuals, and 17.9% had someone living alone who was 65 years of age or older. The average household size was 2.24 and the average family size was 2.85.

The county population contained 23.2% under the age of 18, 4.1% from 18 to 24, 21.7% from 25 to 44, 27.0% from 45 to 64, and 24.1% who were 65 years of age or older. The median age was 46 years. For every 100 females there were 91.5 males. For every 100 females age 18 and over, there were 90.6 males.

The median income for a household in the county was $29,079, and the median income for a family was $34,306. Males had a median income of $23,073 versus $18,714 for females. The per capita income for the county was $18,425. About 8.5% of families and 10.4% of the population were below the poverty line, including 11.1% of those under age 18 and 11.1% of those age 65 or over.

2010 census
As of the 2010 census, there were 2,343 people, 1,098 households, and 658 families in the county. The racial makeup of the county was 97.3% white, 0.7% American Indian, 0.4% Asian, 0.3% black or African American, 0.1% Pacific islander, 0.2% from other races, and 1.1% from two or more races. Those of Hispanic or Latino origin made up 0.9% of the population. In terms of ancestry, 51.8% were German, 29.9% were Norwegian, 8.0% were Irish, 7.4% were Swedish, 7.1% were English, 5.4% were Russian, and 4.6% were American.

Of the 1,098 households, 22.3% had children under the age of 18 living with them, 51.5% were married couples living together, 4.8% had a female householder with no husband present, 40.1% were non-families, and 36.6% of all households were made up of individuals. The average household size was 2.09 and the average family size was 2.69. The median age was 49.5 years.

The median income for a household in the county was $35,966 and the median income for a family was $50,227. Males had a median income of $31,290 versus $25,145 for females. The per capita income for the county was $20,118. About 5.7% of families and 10.6% of the population were below the poverty line, including 7.1% of those under age 18 and 14.2% of those age 65 or over.

Population by decade

Communities

Cities

 Bucyrus
 Haynes
 Hettinger (county seat)
 Reeder

Unincorporated communities
 Petrel
 North Lemmon

Ghost towns
 Petrel

Townships

 Beisigl
 Bucyrus
 Cedar
 Chandler
 Clermont
 Darling Springs
 Duck Creek
 Gilstrap
 Hettinger
 Lightning Creek
 Maine
 Orange
 Reeder
 Scott
 South Fork
 Taylor Butte
 Wolf Butte

Unorganized territories

 Central Adams
 East Adams
 Holden
 West Adams

Defunct townships

 Argonne
 Cedar Butte
 Dakota
 Holden
 Holt
 Jordan
 Kansas City
 Lemmon
 North Lemmon
 Spring Butte
 Whetstone

Politics
Adams County voters have been reliably Republican for decades. In only two national elections since 1936 has the county selected the Democratic Party candidate.

See also
 National Register of Historic Places listings in Adams County, North Dakota

References

External links

 Atlas of Historical County Boundaries
 Official 1968 Adams County, North Dakota Farm & Ranch Directory Directory Service Company Provided by Farm and Home, 1968
 Adams County map, North Dakota DOT

 
1907 establishments in North Dakota
Populated places established in 1907
North Dakota counties
Articles which contain graphical timelines

pnb:ایڈمز کاؤنٹی، نارتھ ڈیکوٹا